The Bushnell Center for the Performing Arts (formerly known as Bushnell Memorial Hall or simply The Bushnell ) is a performing arts venue at 166 Capitol Street in Hartford, Connecticut.  Managed by a non-profit organization, it is marketed as Connecticut's premier presenter of the performing arts.

Building 
The Bushnell (Mortensen Hall) was completed in 1930 by Dotha Bushnell Hillyer as a "living memorial" to her father, the Reverend Dr. Horace Bushnell (1802–1876), a Hartford minister, theologian, philosopher and civic leader. In 2002 the Maxwell M. and Ruth R. Belding Theater was opened.

Mortensen Hall 
The original theater building, Mortensen Hall, seats 2,800 and was designed by the architectural firm of Corbett, Harrison and MacMurray, designers of New York's Radio City Music Hall.  It was built with a traditional Georgian Revival exterior and rich Art Deco interior. The cornerstone was laid October 16, 1928 at the corner of Capitol Avenue and Trinity Street, along with a sealed copper box containing: 1928 Hartford City Directory, issues of the Hartford Courant and Hartford Times, writings of Horace Bushnell, a record of the Constitution and By-Laws of the Memorial, a copy of the CT General Statutes and samples of U.S. currency.

The original building and Mortensen Hall cost roughly $2.8 Million to build and was completed $110,000 under budget.

Mary Seaverns (Horace Bushnell's Grand-daughter), stated that the outside of the Bushnell reflected her grandfather's personal conservatism and the art deco of the interior reflected his modern theology. Named in honor of William H. Mortensen, a Hartford native who originally aspired to be an insurance executive, Mortensen was selected at the age of 24 to be the eyes and ears of the Bushnell Board. He became Managing Director at age 25 (1927) and remained in that position for 40 years retiring in 1968. Mortensen was also Mayor of Hartford from 1943-45.

Mortensen Hall has many special features including:

Drama, the largest hand-painted ceiling mural of its type in the United States, is suspended from the Hall's roof by numerous metal supports. Painted by Barry Faulkner, and 3 Prix de Rome art scholar winners in his NYC studio at Grand Central Station, the painting cost $50,000 to create in 1929. It is 187' X 40'. It has a foundation of wood and paper-mache.

Austin Organ, Mortensen Hall has a 5,600 pipe Austin Organ. Manufactured by the Austin Organ Company of Hartford in 1929 at a cost of $45,000. The pipes are located behind the first 3 bays on both sides of the theatre. It underwent a full restoration in the mid 1980s at a cost of over $500,000.

The Maxwell M. and Ruth R. Belding Theater 
This 906-seat theater, is named in honor of long -time trustee, Maxwell Belding and his family. A theater designed by Wilson, Butler, Lodge, "The Belding" was opened in 2002.

The Hartford Symphony Orchestra performs at the center on a regular basis.

Elephant Eye Theatrical 
In 2005, The Bushnell joined four other performing arts organizations – Citi Performing Arts Center in Boston, the Ordway Center for the Performing Arts in St. Paul, the Kimmel Center for the Performing Arts in Philadelphia, and the Pittsburgh Civic Light Opera Association in conjunction with the Pittsburgh Cultural Trust – in forming the producing consortium Five Cent Productions, LLC. Following this formation, Five Cent Productions joined former Disney Theatrical Productions Executive Vice President Stuart Oken and Tony Award-winning producer Michael Leavitt as a producing partner in Elephant Eye Theatrical.

Elephant Eye Theatrical is a theatrical development and production company that creates new book musicals for Broadway and beyond. The company finds and initiates projects, assembles creative teams, funds the genesis and ongoing evolution of the projects, and serves as lead producer when the projects are fully staged.

Elephant Eye Productions include Saved!, The Addams Family and An American in Paris, set to open on Broadway in April 2015.

Independent Presenters Network 
The Independent Presenter’s Network (IPN) is a consortium of 40 Broadway presenters, theaters and performing arts centers, including The Bushnell. Its members bring Broadway productions to more than 110 cities throughout North America and Japan. The IPN has produced several shows on Broadway including Thoroughly Modern Millie starring Sutton Foster, The Color Purple, and Legally Blonde.

Other 
On December 9, 1962, Sammy Davis Jr. performed a one night only performance.

See also

 List of concert halls
 Music of Connecticut

References 

Concert halls in the United States
Music venues in Connecticut
Buildings and structures in Hartford, Connecticut
Tourist attractions in Hartford, Connecticut
Georgian Revival architecture in Connecticut
Performing arts centers in Connecticut
Theatres completed in 1930
1930 establishments in Connecticut